In Central Asia, an aryk (Turkic: arıq) is a relatively small aqueduct supporting agriculture and providing water to inhabitants of the area. Various aryks still exist and are frequently used, such as that of Tabarja, which has been continuously upgraded and expanded since the 16th century.

References 
 
 
 
 
Irrigation